Abel Alejandro Caputo (born 7 November 2000) is a Venezuelan footballer who plays as a midfielder for Inter Miami CF II in MLS Next Pro.

Career statistics

Club

Notes

References

2000 births
Living people
Venezuelan footballers
Venezuelan expatriate footballers
Association football forwards
Levante UD footballers
K.S.V. Roeselare players
Venezuelan expatriate sportspeople in Spain
Expatriate footballers in Spain
Venezuelan expatriate sportspeople in Belgium
Expatriate footballers in Belgium
Venezuelan expatriate sportspeople in the United States
Expatriate soccer players in the United States
21st-century Venezuelan people
MLS Next Pro players